The 1997 Chatham Cup was the 70th annual nationwide knockout football competition in New Zealand.

Up to the last 16 of the competition, the cup was run in three regions (northern, central, and southern), with an open draw from the quarter-finals on. National League teams received a bye until the third round (last 64). In all, 135 teams took part in the competition, which consisted of five rounds followed by quarter-finals, semi-finals, and a final.

The 1997 final
Central United won the final, beating Napier City Rovers 3–2. 

The Jack Batty Memorial Cup is awarded to the player adjudged to have made to most positive impact in the Chatham Cup final. The winner of the 1997 Jack Batty Memorial Cup was Ivan Vicelich of Central United.

Results

Third Round

* Won on penalties by Waitakere City (6-5)
"Waihopai' received a bye to the Fourth Round.

Fourth Round

* Won on penalties by Three Kings United (3-2)

Fifth Round

Quarter-finals

Semi-finals

Final

References

Rec.Sport.Soccer Statistics Foundation New Zealand 1997 page
UltimateNZSoccer website 1997 Chatham Cup page

Chatham Cup
Chatham Cup
Chatham Cup
Chat